George Scribner (born September 28, 1952) is an artist, director and animator that is best known for having directed the 1988 animated Walt Disney Animation Studios film Oliver & Company.

Biography
Scribner was born and raised in the Republic of Panama, where he attended grade schools and drew his way through most of his classes. After attending The Bolles School in Florida, he majored in film at Emerson College in Boston and moved to Los Angeles to pursue animation and joined Hanna-Barbera Productions. He became an animator at Walt Disney Feature Animation in the mid-1980s and it is in 1988 that he directed Oliver & Company. He also directed the featurette The Prince and the Pauper, starring Mickey Mouse in a duo role playing both himself and the Prince. After working on numerous other features, he was originally going to co-direct The Lion King.

He is currently an animation contractor for Walt Disney Imagineering where he has directed Mickey's PhilharMagic (uncredited), Disneyland: The First 50 Magical Years and Magic Lamp Theatre (Tokyo).

Scribner recently completed documenting the expansion of the Panama Canal through a series of paintings that capture both the magnitude of the project as well as the unique culture and stories of the people of Panama. The paintings can be found on his official website listed below.

He worked as a director on an early version of the Pomp and Circumstance sequence for Fantasia 2000 where Donald Duck was to deliver jewel to the children of the Princes and Princesses of the Disney films. The idea was shelved.

While working at Hanna-Barbera he was story director on The Smurfs, The Biskitts, Challenge of the GoBots and Rock Odyssey.

Scribner is an accomplished painter who is known for painting ocean scenes.

He recently appeared in the 2010 documentary film Waking Sleeping Beauty.

He is a native to Panama City.

Filmography

Television

Film

External links
Official site

1952 births
Living people
People from Panama City
American animators
American film directors
American animated film directors
Emerson College alumni
Panamanian emigrants to the United States
Walt Disney Animation Studios people
Bolles School alumni